During the Japanese invasions of Korea (1592–1598) there were a number of naval battles.

References
 Yi, Min-Woong [이민웅], Imjin Wae-ran Haejeonsa: The Naval Battles of the Imjin War [임진왜란 해전사], Chongoram Media [청어람미디어], 2004, .

See also
Administrative divisions of South Korea
History of Korea
List of naval battles
Japanese invasions of Korea (1592-1598)
Yi Sun-sin
List of battles during the Japanese invasions of Korea (1592–1598)

Japanese invasions, Naval
Japanese invasions of Korea, Naval